Arabella Laura Holzbog (born 1 October 1966) is a British-American actress and visual artist, occasionally credited as Arabella Tjye.

Early life and education 
Born in Stroud, Gloucestershire, England, Holzbog is the daughter of Thomas Jerald Holzbog, an American architect, by his marriage to the Anglo-Norwegian artist, Wendy-Ann Wilson, whose parents were the painter Frank Avray Wilson and his wife Ivy Higford Eckbo. They were married in Surrey in 1958, and had an older daughter, Jessica, born in Kensington in 1963.

Holzbog graduated from Pomona College with a first degree in art, then studied performance art and theatre at Riverside Studios in London. She went on to work as an actress in films, television, and on stage.

Career 
Holzbog appeared in episodes of Alias, Beyond Belief: Fact or Fiction, and Tales from the Crypt. She also appeared in the films Catalina Trust, Carnosaur 2, Stone Cold, Bad News Bears, and Across the Universe.Jacob Levich, The Motion Picture Guide 1996 (1996), p. 186John Willis, ed., Screen World 1992 (Applause Theatre & Cinema Book Publishers, 1993), p. 49

Personal life 
In 1995, Holzbog began to work with Daniel Ezralow, particularly on dance theatre projects, and they were married in 1999 and have two children.

Filmography

Film

Television

References

External links

1966 births
English film actresses
English television actresses
American film actresses
American television actresses
Living people
Pomona College alumni
Actresses from Gloucestershire
People from Stroud
English people of American descent
English people of Norwegian descent
20th-century English actresses
21st-century English actresses
20th-century American actresses
21st-century American actresses
American expatriates in England